Free Radicals is an American band from Houston, Texas, that combines elements of several genres: jazz, funk, ska, reggae, hip-hop, African, and Indian music.

History 
The Free Radicals live band includes six or seven members. On recordings — The Rising Tide Sinks All (1998), Our Lady of Eternal Sunny Delights (2000), Aerial Bombardment (2004), and The Freedom Fence (2012) — Free Radicals invites a group of 50 or more musicians and vocalists into the studio.

Drummer Nick Cooper founded the group in 1996, with a goal of specializing in improvised music. In 2000, The New Yorker wrote, "The horn-heavy, continually evolving collective Free Radicals produces a wildly eclectic fusion that has as many influences as there are items in the Houston, Texas, pawnshop in which they honed their sound during all-night jam sessions." In 2010, Dawn wrote that the artwork and message about underwater oil-leaks, oil-wars, and bank-crashes on the band's first CD was like a "premonition waiting to become true." Free Radicals frequent collaborators and guest musicians include Al Pagliuso, Dan Cooper, Harry Sheppard, Gloria Edwards, Nelson Mills III, Subhendu Chakraborty, and Karina Nistal.

The Free Radicals perform many concerts, marches, and fundraisers for anti-authoritarian and radical groups like food not bombs, peace festivals, and charity events including a continuous 24-hour concert in November 1999 to raise money for Kid Care, a health program for children. They have protested against Halliburton, and participated in marches for immigrant rights and for a Houston janitor's union.

Awards and honors
Free Radicals has won the following 21 awards in Houston

 1998: Best Jazz, Best Unsigned Band
 1999: Best Jazz, Best Funk, Best Drummer
 2001: Best Jazz
 2002: Best Jazz
 2003: Best Jazz
 2004: Best CD by Local Musicians
 2008: Best Jazz
 2009: Best Jazz, Best Drummer
 2010: Best Jazz,
 2011: Best Jazz,
 2012: Best CD "The Freedom Fence", Best Song "Ben Taub Blues", Best Jazz 
 2013: Best Jazz 
 2014: Best Jazz 
 2015: Best Jazz 
 2020: #1 Best Local Album 2020: "White Power Outage"

Discography 
 1998: The Rising Tide Sinks All
 2000: Our Lady of Eternal Sunny Delights 
 2004: Aerial Bombardment 
 2012: The Freedom Fence
 2015: Freedom of Movement
 2017: Outside the Comfort Zone
 2018: No State Solution (with DJ Sun) (compilation/remix album)
 2020: White Power Outage, Vol. 1
 2022: White Power Outage, Vol. 2

Notes

References
 Band member list
 Houston Press articles: 1, 2, 3

External links
 

American funk musical groups
Modern big bands
American disco groups
Klezmer groups
Rocksteady musical groups
Salsa music groups
American hip hop groups
Jam bands
Musical groups from Houston
American reggae musical groups
American ska musical groups
American world music groups
American brass bands
Musical groups established in 1996